The Niblets is a group of rocks in the South Pacific. Charted and named by the British Graham Land Expedition (BGLE), 1934–37, under Rymill. The name suggests the small size of features in the group.

See also 
 List of Antarctic and sub-Antarctic islands

Rock formations of Graham Land
Graham Coast